The year 1546 in science and technology included a number of events, some of which are listed here.

Botany
 Hieronymus Bock publishes the second, illustrated, edition of his flora of Germany, the Kreutterbuch.

Medicine
 Antonio Musa Brassavola of Ferrara publishes the first definitely recorded successful tracheostomy.
 Valerius Cordus' pharmacopoeia Dispensatorium published posthumously in Nuremberg.
 Girolamo Fracastoro, in his De Contagione et Contagiosis Morbis (published in Venice), discusses the transmission of infectious diseases and gives the first description of typhus.
 Giovanni Filippo Ingrassia describes the stapes bone of the middle ear.

Births
 December 14 – Tycho Brahe, Danish astronomer (died 1601).
 date unknown
 Thomas Digges, English astronomer (died 1595)
 Heo Jun, Korean physician (died 1615)
 Katharina Kepler, née Guldenmann, German healer and mother of Johannes Kepler (died 1622)
 approx. date – Paul Wittich, German astronomer and mathematician (died 1586)

Deaths
 Ruy López de Villalobos, Spanish explorer (born 1500)

References

 
16th century in science
1540s in science